Walter Henryk Brom (14 January 1921 – 18 June 1968) was a Polish soccer goalkeeper. Brom, who played for Ruch Chorzów, was a reserve player of Polish team in FIFA World Cup 1938. He was (and to this day is) the youngest goalie who has ever been listed in any World Cup finals. In early June 1938, when the tournament took place, he was only 17 years and 4 months old.

Brom did not play in the legendary Poland - Brazil 5-6 match (5 June 1938, Strasbourg, France). He spent the whole game on the bench - Polish goal was guarded by Edward Madejski. He is one of the few players who continued his career after World War II. What is more - only in 1948 did Brom debut in the Poland national football team.

During World War II, Brom was forced to join the Wehrmacht.

See also
 Polish Roster in World Cup Soccer France 1938

References

External links
 

1921 births
1968 deaths
Polish footballers
Poland international footballers
Ruch Chorzów players
1938 FIFA World Cup players
Sportspeople from Chorzów
German military personnel of World War II
Association football goalkeepers